The Engeyjarætt goes back to a married couple who lived in Engey in Kollafjörður in the first half of the 19th century, Ólöf Snorradóttir (1783–1844), who was born and raised in the island, and Pétur Guðmundsson (1786–1852), who was born in Örfirisey and raised there and in Skildinganes. They had eight children who survived childhood and had a large number of descendants, most of whom settled in Seltjarnarnes and in the Vesturbær district of Reykjavík. In fact, it can be reckoned that most of their descendants, who now (as of 2011) number almost five thousand, still live in the capital area. Only one of their children moved from the area, Guðríður (1812–1889), who became priest's wife in the east of the country and has a number of descendants there and in Húnaþing.

Well known Icelanders of the Engeyjarætt
 Benedikt Sveinsson, parliamentarian
 Pétur Benediktsson, parliamentarian of the Independence Party and chairman of Landsbanki
 Bjarni Benediktsson (born 1908), prime minister, from the Independence Party
 Bjarni Benediktsson (born 1970), prime minister and leader of the Independence Party
 Björn Bjarnason, justice minister
 Halldór Blöndal, samgönguráðherra
 Valgerður Bjarnadóttir, parliamentarian of the Samfylking and wife of Vilmundur Gylfason
 Ragnhildur Helgadóttir, parliamentarian
 Jónmundur Guðmarsson, CEO of GAMMA, and member of the Independence Party

Icelandic culture